Alessio Cragno (born 28 June 1994) is an Italian professional footballer who plays as a goalkeeper for  club Monza, on loan from Cagliari. He represents the Italy national team.

Club career

Brescia 
Cragno made his debut at Brescia Calcio on 25 September 2012 against Modena in a Serie B game, as the starting keeper, ahead of Stefano Russo; first choice keeper Michele Arcari was rested. Brescia won the game 2–1 after two goals from Andrea Caracciolo. Before the start of season Brescia had sold their first choice keeper Nicola Leali to Juventus. Cragno has been the first-choice regular since the 2013–14 season and performed well. Cragno also signed a contract with Brescia which would last until 30 June 2016, in 2012–13 season.

Cagliari 
In July 2014, Cragno moved to Serie A side Cagliari, penning a four-year deal for a fee of €1 million. His debut for Cagliari was in a Serie A match against Roma on 21 September 2014, losing 2–0.

Loan to Lanciano 
In January 2016 he was loaned to Lanciano in Serie B, who by the end of the season were relegated to Lega Pro after losing the play-out matches against Salernitana. On 9 June 2016, Cragno signed a new four-year deal with Cagliari.

Loan to Benevento 
In summer 2016, he was sent again on loan with option to buy, to Serie B newcomer Benevento. After a successful season, in which Benevento achieved the promotion to Serie A through play-offs with Cragno as the starting goalkeeper, he returned to Cagliari in the summer of 2017.

Return to Cagliari 
During the 2017–18 season he returned to Cagliari, establishing himself as the goalkeeper of the rossoblù team. He played 29 Serie A games, as well as a game in the Coppa Italia – keeping a clean sheet on 7 occasions. The team remained in the top flight after finishing in 16th place.

In the 2018–19 season Cragno stood out as one of the best goalkeepers in the league: he won the Premio Apport for best goalkeeper in Serie A, being voted by the Associazione Italiana Preparatori Portieri Calcio (Italian Association of Goalkeepers Trainers). He finished the season as the player with the most minutes played in the league (3,686) and the goalkeeper with the most saves made (152).

He renewed his contract with Cagliari until 2024. On 7 August 2019, during a pre-season friendly match played in Istanbul against Fenerbahçe, he sustained an injury and remained on the sidelines for five months. He returned to the field on 26 January 2020, in a 1–1 draw against Inter Milan.

Loan to Monza 
On 27 June 2022, Cragno joined newly-promoted Serie A side Monza on a one-year loan, with an option and conditional obligation for purchase. He made his debut on 8 August, in a 3–2 Coppa Italia win against Frosinone.

International career 
Cragno made his debut with the Italy under-21 squad on 4 June 2014, replacing Francesco Bardi in a friendly match won 4–0 against Montenegro. In June 2017, he was included in the Italy under-21 squad for the 2017 UEFA European Under-21 Championship by manager Luigi Di Biagio.

Cragno was given his first senior international call-up for Italy in September 2018, by manager Roberto Mancini, for Italy's opening UEFA Nations League matches against Poland and Portugal later that month. On 7 October 2020, Cragno made his senior International debut for Italy in a friendly match against Moldova, replacing Salvatore Sirigu in the second half of a 6–0 home win.

Career statistics

Club

International

Honours 
Individual
 Serie B Footballer of the Year: 2017

References

External links 

 Profile at A.C. Monza
 

Living people
1994 births
People from Fiesole
Sportspeople from the Metropolitan City of Florence
Footballers from Tuscany
Association football goalkeepers
Italian footballers
Brescia Calcio players
Cagliari Calcio players
S.S. Virtus Lanciano 1924 players
Benevento Calcio players
A.C. Monza players
Serie B players
Serie A players
Italy youth international footballers
Italy under-21 international footballers
Italy international footballers